Hemaris beresowskii is a moth of the family Sphingidae. It is known from south-western China.

There is a transparent discal cell on the forewing that is generally divided longitudinally by a vestigial scaled fold. The hindwing upperside very similar to Hemaris ottonis.

References

B
Moths of Asia
Insects of China
Moths described in 1897